Louis Philippe II (Louis Philippe Joseph; 13 April 17476 November 1793), was a major French noble who supported the French Revolution.

Louis Philippe II was born at the Château de Saint-Cloud to Louis Philippe I, Duke of Chartres, and Louise Henriette de Bourbon. He was titled Duke of Montpensier at birth. When his grandfather Louis, Duke of Orléans, died in 1752, his father became the new Duke of Orléans and Louis Philippe II became Duke of Chartres. When his father died in 1785, he became Duke of Orléans and First Prince of the Blood. He was styled as Serene Highness. 

In 1792, during the Revolution, Louis Philippe changed his name to Philippe Égalité. He was a cousin of King Louis XVI and one of the wealthiest men in France. He actively supported the Revolution of 1789, and was a strong advocate for the elimination of the present absolute monarchy in favor of a constitutional monarchy. Louis Philippe voted for the death of Louis XVI; however, he was himself guillotined in 1793 during the Reign of Terror. His son, also named Louis Philippe, became King of the French after the July Revolution of 1830. After Louis Philippe II, the term Orléanist came to be attached to the movement in France that favored a constitutional monarchy.

Early life

Louis Philippe Joseph d'Orléans was the son of Louis Philippe d'Orléans, Duke of Chartres, and Louise Henriette de Bourbon. Philippe was a member of the House of Orléans, a cadet branch of the French royal family. His mother came from the House of Bourbon-Condé.

Philippe was born at the Château de Saint-Cloud, one of the residences of the Duke of Orléans, five kilometers west of Paris. His older sister, born in 1745, died when she was six months old. His younger sister, Bathilde d'Orléans, was born in 1750.

Succession 
Philippe's first title, given to him at birth, was that of the Duke of Montpensier. After his grandfather's death in 1752, Philippe inherited the title of Duke of Chartres. After his father's death in 1785, Philippe became the Duke of Orléans, head of the House of Orléans, one of the wealthiest noble families in France. At his father's death, Philippe became the Premier Prince du Sang, First Prince of the Blood, which put him in line for the succession to the throne immediately after the comte d'Artois, the youngest brother of Louis XVI.

Personal life

Marriage
 
On 6 June 1769, Louis Philippe married Louise Marie Adélaïde de Bourbon at the chapel of the Palace of Versailles. She was the daughter of his cousin, Louis Jean Marie de Bourbon, Duke of Penthièvre, one of the richest men in France. Since it was certain that his wife would become the richest woman in France upon the death of her father, Louis Philippe was able to play a political role in court equal to that of his great-grandfather Philippe II, Duke of Orléans, who had been the Regent of France during the minority of Louis XV. Louise Marie Adélaïde brought to the already wealthy House of Orléans a considerable dowry of six million livres, an annual income of 240,000 livres (later increased to 400,000 livres), as well as lands, titles, residences and furniture.
Unlike her husband, the Duchess of Orléans did not support the Revolution. She was a devout Catholic who supported keeping the monarchy in France, as well as following the orders of Pope Pius VI. This was the causes of one of the rifts of the couple, as their first son, the future "King of the French", followed his father's footsteps and joined the Jacobin faction.

Scandals 

During the first few months of their marriage, the couple appeared devoted to each other, but the Duke went back to the life of libertinage he had led before his marriage. The Duke was a well-known womanizer and, like several of his ancestors, such as Louis XIV and Philippe II, Duke of Orléans, had several illegitimate children.

During the summer of 1772, the Duke began his secret liaison with one of his wife's ladies-in-waiting, Stéphanie Félicité, comtesse de Genlis, the niece of Madame de Montesson, the morganatic wife of Philippe's father. Passionate at first, the liaison cooled within a few months and, by the spring of 1773, was reported to be "dead". After the romantic affair was over, Madame de Genlis remained in the service of Marie-Adélaïde at the Palais-Royal, a trusted friend to both the Duke and the Duchess. They both appreciated her intelligence and, in July 1779, she became the governess of the couple's twin daughters (born in 1777). One of his best known lovers was Grace Elliott. 

It was alleged that Lady Edward FitzGerald, born Stephanie Caroline Anne Syms, also known as Pamela, was a natural daughter of the Duke and the Countess of Genlis. He recognized a son he had with Marguerite Françoise Bouvier de la Mothe de Cépoy, comtesse de Buffon, Victor Leclerc de Buffon (6 September 179220 April 1812), known as the chevalier de Saint-Paul and chevalier d'Orléans.

Military career
In 18th century France, it was very common for royal princes to receive high positions in the military. From a young age, Philippe d'Orléans displayed his interest in naval matters, and he received three years of training in the Navy. 

In 1776, he held the rank of Chef d'Escadre, and commanded one of the three divisions of the Escadre d'évolution, with his flag on the 64-gun Solitaire.

When the Anglo-French War broke out in 1778, Orléans was Lieutenant général des Armées navales, in charge of an entire squadron. He commanded the Blue squadron that formed the rear of the French fleet under Orvilliers, with his flag on the 80-gun Saint-Esprit. At the Battle of Ushant, on 27 July 1778, the French fleet fought in inverted order, putting the Blue squadron at the vanguard of the French line of battle. During the battle, Orléans' squadron failed to exploit a gap in the British line, allowing the rear of Keppel's fleet to escape.

Orléans returned to Paris claiming the battle had been a resounding victory, and received a hero's welcome. When it transpired that these claims were overstated that the battle had been more of a draw, Orléans' credibility suffered an unrecoverable blow. He withdrew from the Navy and asked the army if they could give him a position, but it was denied.

Role in the French Revolution

Liberal ideology 
In August 1787 the Duke of Orléans and his secretary Charles-Louis Ducrest, the brother of Madame de Genlis, came up with proposals to improve the financial situation of France. Philippe d'Orléans became a member of the Society of the Friends of the Constitution, and strongly adhered to the principles of Denis Diderot, Voltaire and Jean-Jacques Rousseau. He was interested in creating a more moral and democratic form of government in France. As he grew more and more interested in Rousseau's ideas, he began to promote Enlightenment ideas, such as the separation of church and state and limited monarchy. He also advocated and voted against feudalism and slavery.

In addition to being a Jacobin, Philippe was also the Grand Master of the Masonic Grand Orient de France, the most powerful Masonic Obedience in worldwide Continental Freemasonry (which stands opposed to the "Regular" Freemasonry of the United Grand Lodge of England and the majority of lodges in the United States of America), from 1771 to 1793, even though he did not attend a meeting until 1777. He later distanced himself from Freemasonry in a letter dated January 1793, and the Grand Orient vacated his position on 13 December 1793 (however, Philippe had already been executed weeks before).

Philippe was also a strong admirer of the British constitutional monarchy. He strongly advocated for France's adoption of a constitutional monarchy rather than the absolute monarchy that was present in France at the time.

Palais-Royal 
As the new Duke of Orléans, one of the many estates Philippe inherited from his father was the Palais-Royal, which became known as the Palais-Égalité in 1792, because he opened up its doors to all people of France, regardless of their estate (class). He employed Swiss guards to refuse entry only to "drunkards, women in excessively indecent dress, and those in tatters." He built shops and cafés where people could interact, and soon it became a hub for social life in Paris. As the Parisian police had no authority to enter the Duke's private property, it became a hub for illegal activity, such as trade in stolen goods, suspicious deals, and the spread of revolutionary ideas. In fact, it was a common place for Jacobins to meet and discuss their plans and ideas. Many members of the National Assembly claimed that the Palais-Royal was the "birthplace of the Revolution." Philippe's goal was to create a place where people could meet, which he argued was a crucial part of democracy and a "physical need for civil life."

During the months leading up to the outbreak of revolutionary violence in July 1789, Philippe d'Orléans undertook several personal actions having the effect of increasing his personal standing amongst the population at large. These included his endorsement of a pamphlet outlining the process to be followed in the setting up of local assemblies, the sale of artwork to provide funds for poor relief and an incident during the Reveillon riots where he scattered coins amongst a cheering crowd.

Leadership in the Estates-General
Philippe d'Orléans was elected to the Estates General by three districts: by the nobility of Paris, Villers-Cotterêts, and Crépy-en-Valois. As a noble in the Second Estate, he was the head of the liberal minority under the guidance of Adrien Duport. Although he was a member of the Second Estate, he felt a strong connection to the Third Estate, as they comprised the majority of the members in the Estates-General, yet were the most underrepresented. When the Third Estate decided to take the Tennis Court Oath and break away from the Estates-General to form the National Assembly, Philippe was one of the first to join them and was a very important figure in the unification of the nobility and the Third Estate. In fact, he led his minority group of 47 nobles to secede from their estate and join the National Assembly.

Women's March on Versailles and exile 
One of the main accusations thrown at Philippe d'Orléans was the initiation of the Women's March on Versailles on 5 October 1789, which people believed was done in order to overthrow the King and gain popularity amongst the people. He was accused of funding the riots, as well as calling the rioters his "friends", who were chanting: "Long live our father, long live King d'Orléans!" The High Court of the Grand Châtelet also accused him of acting as an accomplice to Honoré Gabriel Riqueti, comte de Mirabeau, in an attempt to murder Louis XVI and his wife, Marie Antoinette, during this period.

The Marquis de Lafayette, who was a strong power in France at the time and a supposed "friend" of d'Orléans, suggested to him to go to the British Isles with the promise that he could potentially become the head of state of Brabant. However, the truth is that Lafayette viewed d'Orléans as a threat to his control of the French Revolution. His goal was simply to get Philippe out of the country.

At first, it was difficult to convince d'Orléans to leave France during these troubling times, but after strong pressure and enticement from Lafayette, he ended up leaving. Throughout his weeks in exile, he wrote several memoirs mentioning his strong desire to return to France. When he did return, he never regained the same power and influence he enjoyed in the years before he left. Those who did not support him, as well as people overseas, labeled him as a coward for fleeing to England as a result of his accusations, calling it a period of "exile." However, he was able to keep his position in the National Assembly until it disbanded on September 30, 1791.

Citoyen Égalité
Due to the liberal ideology that separated Philippe d'Orléans from the rest of his royal family, he always felt uncomfortable with his name. He felt that the political connotations associated with his name did not match his democratic and Enlightenment philosophies, thus he requested that the Paris Commune (French Revolution) allow his name to be changed, which was granted. Shortly after the September Massacres in 1792, he changed his surname to Égalité, ("equality" in English). As one of the three words in the motto of the French Revolution (Liberté, Égalité, Fraternité), he felt that this name better represented him as a symbol of the French people and what they were fighting for.

Égalité also attributed his new surname to the reputation of generosity that he had among the people of France, especially the poor. He was well known for distributing food and money to the poor, as well as providing shelter for homeless during the severe winter of 1788–1789.

Relationship with King Louis XVI 
Although a relative of King Louis XVI, Philippe d'Orléans never maintained a positive relationship with his cousin. Upon inheriting the title of Duke of Orléans, Philippe also became the Premier Prince du Sang – the most important personage of the kingdom after the king's immediate family. Therefore, he would be next in line to the throne should the main Bourbon line die out. For this reason, many  supposed that Philippe's goal was to take his cousin's throne. Philippe and the King's wife, Marie Antoinette, also detested each other. Marie Antoinette hated him for what she viewed as treachery, hypocrisy and selfishness, and he, in turn, scorned her for her frivolous and spendthrift lifestyle. The King's reluctance to grant Philippe a position in the army after the indecisive result at the Battle of Ushant is said to be another reason for Philippe's discontent with the King.

One of the most astounding events occurred when Philippe took a vote in favor of Louis XVI's execution. He had agreed among close friends that he would vote against his execution, but surrounded by the Montagnards, a radical faction in the National Convention, he turned on his word, to the surprise of many. A majority (75 votes) was necessary to indict the King, and an overwhelming number of 394 votes were collected in favor of his death. The King was especially shocked by the news, stating:

"It really pains me to see that Monsieur d'Orléans, my kinsman, voted for my death."

Death 

On 1 April 1793, a decree was voted for within the Convention, including Égalité's vote, that condemned anyone with "strong presumptions of complicity with the enemies of Liberty." At the time, Égalité's son, Louis Philippe, who was a general in the French army, joined General Dumouriez in a plot to visit the Austrians, who were an enemy of France. Although there was no evidence that convicted Égalité himself of treason, the simple relationship that his son had with Dumouriez, a traitor in the eyes of the Convention, was enough to get him and Louis Charles, Count of Beaujolais arrested on 4 April 1793, and the other members of the Bourbon family still in France on the days after. He spent several months incarcerated at Fort Saint-Jean in Marseille until he was sent back to Paris. On 2 November 1793, he was imprisoned at the Conciergerie. Tried by the Revolutionary Tribunal on 6 November, he was sentenced to death, and guillotined the same day.

Issue
The Duke and Duchess of Orléans had six legally-recognized children:

A daughter (died at birth, 10 October 1771);
Louis Philippe I, King of the French (6 October 177326 August 1850), became King of the French (1830–1848);
Louis Antoine Philippe d'Orléans (3 July 177518 May 1807), died in exile in Salt Hill, then in Buckinghamshire, England;
Françoise d'Orléans Mademoiselle d'Orléans (twin sister of Adélaïde) (1777–1782);
Louise Marie Adélaïde Eugénie d'Orléans; (23 August 177731 December 1847);
Louis Charles d'Orléans (17 October 177930 May 1808), died in exile in Malta.

Ancestry

Titles and succession

13 April 17474 February 1752 His Serene Highness the Duke of Montpensier (Monseigneur le duc de Montpensier)
4 February 175218 November 1785 His Serene Highness the Duke of Chartres (Monseigneur le duc de Chartres)
18 November 17856 November 1793 His Serene Highness the Duke of Orléans (Monseigneur le duc d'Orléans)
Succeeded to this style on the death of his father. Was entitled to this style and rank due to him being the First Prince of The Blood.

Popular culture
Philippe d'Orléans has been portrayed in several films, such as the 1938 film, Marie Antoinette, in which he was portrayed by Joseph Schildkraut, and the 2001 film The Lady and the Duke by Jean-Claude Dreyfus.

Philippe d'Orléans was an antagonist in the anime "The Rose of Versailles" by Riyoko Ikeda.

Sources and references 
 Notes

Citations

References
 
 

1747 births
1793 deaths
People from Saint-Cloud
Dukes of Chartres
Dukes of Orléans
Dukes of Nemours
Dukes of Montpensier
Dukes of Valois
Dukes of Étampes
Deputies to the French National Convention
French Freemasons
Jacobins
Regicides of Louis XVI
Executed royalty
French people executed by guillotine during the French Revolution
Princes of France (Bourbon)
Masonic Grand Masters
18th-century peers of France
Dukes of Carignan